John Goto (born 1949 Stockport, England) is a British photographic artist. His work addresses a range of historical, cultural and socio-political subject areas, often using a satirical approach.

Goto's first one-man exhibition, Goto, Photographs 1971-81, was held at The Photographer's Gallery in London in 1981. Other solo shows include Terezin, at the Raab Gallery, Berlin, in 1988; The Scar, Manchester City Museum and Art Gallery, 1993; The Commissar of Space, Modern Art, Oxford, 1998; Loss of Face, Tate Britain, London, 2002; High Summer, The British Academy, London, 2005; and Dreams of Jelly Roll, Freud Museum, London, 2012.

Goto was Artist-in-Residence at Kettle's Yard, University of Cambridge, 1988-9.

Goto's books include Ukadia, published to coincide with a solo exhibition at Djanogly Art Gallery, Nottingham, 2003, and Lovers’ Rock, which is a series of portraits made in 1977 by Goto of young British Afro-Caribbeans.

In 2007, the Telegraph listed Goto as one of the top 100 living geniuses.

References

External links
 Official website
 Review of High Summer by Elisabeth Mahoney in The Guardian
 Photographic Migrants: John Goto’s West End Blues' by Dr Nancy Roth in Flusser Studies, Multilingual Journal for Cultural and Media Theory
 Review of New World Circus by Tim Teeman in The Times
 National Portrait Gallery collection

1949 births
Photographers from Cheshire
Academics of the University of Derby
Living people
People from Stockport